The Calgary Stampeders were a defunct ice hockey team that was based in Calgary, Alberta, Canada.  The team existed from 1938 until 1972, playing in various senior amateur and minor professional leagues during that time.  In 1946, the Stampeders captured the Allan Cup as Canadian senior hockey champions, the first Alberta based club to do so.

A team of this same name also played the 1978–79 season in the Western International Hockey League.

History

Senior hockey
The 1945–46 Stampeders were a powerhouse in the Western Canada Senior Hockey League (WCSHL).  Led by Ken "Red" Hunter's then senior-amateur record 81 points, the Stamps finished first overall in the WCSHL with a 28–7–1 record, earning a bye into the league championship where they quickly dispatched the Edmonton Flyers four games to one.  The Stamps then faced the Winnipeg Orioles for the Prairie championship.  While Winnipeg's coach predicted his team would sweep Calgary in three games, it was instead the Stampeders who eliminated Winnipeg in three by scores of 5–1, 10–2 and 8–2. In the Western Canada final, the Stampeders once again easily handled their opponents, this time, the Trail Smoke Eaters.  After tying the first two games, Calgary won the next two by 7–3 and 4–2 scores to reach the Allan Cup final against the Hamilton Tigers.

The series almost never happened.  With the tournament scheduled to be held out west, the Hamilton players considered forgoing the Allan Cup final as the $6 per day they were offered for the trip was not enough to be able to take time off from their jobs.  The Tigers did make the trip, however, and were easily dispatched by the Stampeders in five games, winning the fifth game by a 1–0 score in Edmonton before a crowd of 6,000.

In 1946-47, the Stampeders once again reached the Allan Cup final.  They were defeated, however, by the Montreal Royals.  The deciding game was held in Quebec City in front of over 11,000 spectators.

As occurred frequently with senior hockey, growing concerns were surfacing regarding the status of players, as many teams were using former professionals in violation of the rules laid out by the Allan Cup committee.  Many teams, including the Stampeders, were facing pressure to declare whether they were professional or amateur teams.

Professional hockey
Before the start of the 1951–52 season, the Stampeders, along with their provincial cousins, the Edmonton Flyers, officially turned professional, joining the Pacific Coast Hockey League, which was renamed the Western Hockey League (WHL) by the 1952–53 season.  The WHL was the top professional league in Western Canada and the United States. The Stampeders became the minor-league affiliate of the Chicago Black Hawks.

The Stampeders quickly found success in the minor-pro ranks, winning the WHL title in 1953–54, defeating the Vancouver Canucks four games to one. The Stampeders then went on to face the Quebec Aces of the Quebec Hockey League in the Edinburgh Trophy for the championship of Canadian minor professional hockey.  Calgary won the best-of-nine series in six games, with the clinching game held in Calgary, a 4–2 victory in front of 6,500 fans.

The Stampeders would reach the WHL final three more times: in 1955, falling to the Flyers in a four-game sweep; in 1958, when they fell to the Canucks; and in 1959, falling to the Victoria Cougars.  During this time, The Stampeders were one of the top draws in the league.  Including all playoff games, the 1953–54 Stampeders drew over 300,000 fans in a city of 150,000.  In 1955–56, Calgary drew 157,803 fans in the regular season, second only to the Winnipeg Warriors.

In 1963, disenchanted with their affiliation with the Chicago Black Hawks, the Stampeders took a one-year leave of absence. Gordon Love, chairman of the Calgary Stampede Board, owners of the Stampeders, stated: "We have been treated so shabbily by Chicago, that we have no alternative... Tommy Ivan simply wasn't interested in the future of hockey in Calgary, and that's all there is to it."  The Stampeders had also lost $90,000 during the season.  Isolated in what was now a mostly Pacific coast league, Edmonton suspended operations along with Calgary.  Neither team would ever resume operations, as the Flyers decided they could not be financially stable in the old Edmonton Gardens, and Calgary could not go it alone without an Edmonton team.

Revivals 
The Calgary Stampeders name was revived for teams playing amateur senior hockey in later years: three seasons in the Alberta Senior Hockey League, one season in the Prairie Hockey League, and one season in the Western International Hockey League.

League membership
The Stampeders played in the following leagues:

1938-42: Alberta Senior Hockey League (amateur)
1942-45: Did not operate (World War II)
1945-51: Western Canada Senior Hockey League (amateur)
1951-52: Pacific Coast Hockey League (minor pro)
1952-63: Western Hockey League (minor pro)
1968-71: Alberta Senior Hockey League (amateur)
1971-72: Prairie Hockey League (amateur)
1978-79: Western International Hockey League (amateur)

Season-by-season record
Note: GP = Games played, W = Wins, L = Losses, T = Ties Pts = Points, GF = Goals for, GA = Goals against

NHL alumni
Partially as a result of their affiliation with the Black Hawks, 84 former Stampeders would also play in the National Hockey League.

See also
Alberta-British Columbia Senior League
Ice hockey in Calgary
List of ice hockey teams in Alberta

References

Footnotes

General

Calgary Public Library article on Stampede Corral
Edmonton Oilers Heritage: Calgary Stampeders
hockeyleaguehistory.com WCSHL standings
hockeydb.com

External links
1946 Calgary Herald article celebrating Allan Cup victory

 
Alberta Senior Hockey League teams
Defunct ice hockey teams in Canada
Stam
Ice hockey teams in Alberta
Ice hockey clubs established in 1938
Ice hockey clubs disestablished in 1972
1938 establishments in Alberta
1972 disestablishments in Alberta
Western Hockey League (1952–1974) teams